Governor Bryan may refer to:

Albert Bryan (politician) (born 1968), 9th Governor of the United States Virgin Islands
Charles W. Bryan (1867–1945), 20th and 23rd Governor of Nebraska
George Bryan (1731–1791), 2nd President of Pennsylvania
Henry Francis Bryan (1865–1944), 17th Governor of American Samoa
Richard Bryan (born 1937), 25th Governor of Nevada

See also
Governor Bryant (disambiguation)